Capellanía is a wetland situated in the locality of Fontibón as one of the Wetlands of Bogotá, Colombia. It forms part of the Fucha River basin on the Bogotá savanna. Since 1995, it has been split into two due to the construction of the Avenida La Esperanza. This has caused rapid deterioration and the wetland is likely to disappear because of the industries that surround it, the current transportation projects of the area, and future developments approved by the district.

Flora and fauna 
Due to the industrial activities around the wetland, it hardly hosts fauna.

Flora 
Flora registered in the wetland are among others kikuyu grass (Pennisetum clandestinum), southern bulrush (Scirpus californicus) and larger bur-marigold (Bidens laevis).

See also 

Biodiversity of Colombia, Bogotá savanna, Thomas van der Hammen Natural Reserve
Wetlands of Bogotá

References

Bibliography

External links 
  Fundación Humedales de Bogotá
  Conozca los 15 humedales de Bogotá - El Tiempo

Wetlands of Bogotá